Reverse charge may refer to:

 Reverse charge call, also known as a collect call
 Reverse charging, resulting from a mistake in use or charging of rechargeable batteries
 The accrual of VAT by the buyer of goods or services
 A trick in pen spinning, in which the pen spins counter-clockwise between two fingers, as opposed to charge, in which pen spins clockwise
 A process of transfer power from one smartphone to another smartphone or device; see